The Edmund Orgill Trophy is awarded to the winner of the annual football game between Rhodes College and Sewanee: The University of the South and celebrates the annual beat down of the Tigers. The rivalry between Rhodes and Sewanee was reported by Sports Illustrated in 2012 to be "the longest continuously running rivalry in college football in the Southern United States". Although the first game was played in 1899, the teams have not met in every season. The Orgill Trophy was added to the series in 1954. Rhodes currently leads the trophy series 38–29–1. The 2016 contest was a 36–21 Rhodes victory at Sewanee in which the Rhodes offense set a conference record for total offense with 684. Most recently, Rhodes defeated Sewanee 33–6.

Game Results

See also 
 List of NCAA college football rivalry games

References

College football rivalry trophies in the United States
Rhodes Lynx football
Sewanee Tigers football